The  was an immigrant royal family descended from Goguryeo Prince Go Yak'gwang (高若光) who became known as "Genbu Jakkō" (玄武若光) and later as "Koma no Jakkō" (高麗若光). He was a son of the 28th and last King of Goguryeo, Bojang. In 666, after a power struggle with his brothers or as refuge from Tang's attack (opinion in dispute), he came to the old capital of Asuka in Japan during the reign of Emperor Tenji. Goguryeo fell to Tang in 668 and in 699 his brother Go Deokmu (高德武) founded Lesser Goguryeo. The characters "高麗" can also be read as "Goryeo" (abbreviation of Goguryeo) instead of Koma.

In 703 he was given the court rank of Junior Fifth Rank, Lower Grade (ju go-i no ge, 従五位下) by Emperor Monmu and became a lower ranking official (Zaichokanin).

In 716 A.D., Jakkō was instructed to gather the 1,799 Goguryeo refugees, who initially came with him, from all over Japan and settle them in the wilderness of the Musashino Plain with a commanding view of the mountains (now known as Hidaka). Jakkō was to be their tribal chief and representative. When Jakkō died, the Koma Shrine was built to remember him. Next to the Koma Shrine, settlers from Goguryeo founded the Shoden-in Buddhist Temple to mark Jakkō's tomb. For centuries, they thrived in the area and kept within their own family. The Koma Shrine remains a symbol of the ancient ties between Korea and Japan. Today, Jakkō's 60th linear descendant, 35-year-old Koma Fumiyasu, is a Shinto priest at his family's ancestral shrine. Built in Korea's shamanist tradition, the building took its present form when the Meiji government forced all worshipers to adopt state Shinto. It's one of hundreds of Shinto shrines across Japan that were built by Korean immigrants. The shrine became an important fixture in propagating the ancient ties between Korea and Japan. Today, the shrine serves as a symbol of friendship between Japan and Korea.

The Koma District given to the Goguryeo people stretched from the foothills of the mountains throughout the vast flatlands of Musashino all the way to today's Sayama city. For many centuries, the Koma folks married only among their own family or people, they managed to stay out of most of the Japanese clan wars ravaging the country later on. They thrived in Japan and were a powerful force in their area.
In present days, the Koma family and Goguryeo people are said to be the origin of Samurai culture of Japan.
They brought horses, iron weaponry and armor making skills, etc. to Japan.  After few centuries since their arrival to Japan, horse riding
warrior forces started to emerge here and there with iron weaponry and armor in Kwandong area, which includes their settled district.

Koma Shrine
Saitama Koma-jinja (埼玉 高麗神社) is located in Niihori, Hidaka City, Saitama Prefecture. The enshrined deities are Koma no Koshiki Jakkō, Sarutahiko no Mikoto and Takenouchi no Sukune (a legendary statesman). The shrine was founded in 716 by an emissary from Goguryeo, Jakkō, as the head shrine to guard the Koma district (present-day Hidaka City). It was originally named Shirahige Myojin and is the headquarters of all the 55 Shirahige and Shirahige Myojin shrines in the Musashi province (present-day Saitama Prefecture), from which it is also called Koma Soja Shrine (the head shrine). In the precinct are a lot of cultural properties including the Old Koma Family Residence. Since the Meiji period, a lot of people, who had visited this shrine to offer a prayer, became powerful politicians including prime ministers, the shrine has been worshipped as Shusse (career success) Myojin. Koma Shrine is also famous for cherry blossoms in spring and chrysanthemum flowers in fall. In 2016 the 1300th Anniversary of Koma shrine was held.

Family Tree
  (?–682) - last king of Goguryeo
  　┃
  "Jakkō" (高麗若光) (?–?) - came to Japan in 666
  　┃
  (?–?) -
  　┃
  (?–?) -
  　┃
  (?–?) -
  　┃
  (?–?) -
  　┃
  (?–?) -
  　┃
  (?–?) -
  　┃
  (?–?) -
  　┃

See also
 Goguryeo
 Little Goguryeo
 Koreans in Japan
 Japanese clans
 Go Deokmu
 King Bojang

References

Links
 Koma shrine Homepage
 Koma clan genealogy (in Japanese)
 The 1300th Anniversary of Koma

Japanese clans
Japanese people of Korean descent